La Veta (Spanish for "the vein") is a statutory town in Huerfano County, Colorado, United States.  The town population was 800 as of the 2010 United States Census.

History
Col. John M. Francisco, the sutler at Fort Garland, and his business partner, Henry Daigre, purchased 48,000 acres of land in Cuchara Valley in 1862. The land was part of the Vigil land grant. They established a settlement for farmers and ranchers, with Francisco Fort as the commercial center. The 100-foot-square building was constructed with 2-foot thick adobe walls, interior rooms, that opened up to a central plaza. It was built with a flat roof with gun ports along the parapets. In 1863, the fort was attacked by a band of Ute Indians. Men got on the roof to defend the fort, and a volunteer rode to Fort Lyon. The Utes departed before the troops arrived.

In 1871, the settlement was named Spanish Peak and a post office was established. New settlers came to the area with the arrival of the Denver & Rio Grande Railroad. The narrow gauge railroad, which crossed La Veta Pass, was the highest U.S. railroad pass at the time. A depot, the La Veta Pass Narrow Gauge Railroad Depot, was built one block north of the fort and the town was platted by the railroad in 1876. The fort is now operated by the Huerfano Historical Society. A post office called La Veta has been in operation since 1876. The community was named for a mineral deposit near the original town site, La Veta meaning  "mineral vein" in Spanish.

On the morning of 8 November 1913, William Gambling, a miner who had refused to join the 1913-1914 United Mine Workers of America strike against the Colorado Fuel and Iron company, was intercepted and accosted by pro-strikers as he was traveling to the dentist in La Veta. He left the dentist's office later and was picked up by a car carrying three mine guards and a driver. A volley of gunfire was aimed at the car, killing all but Gambling. At least five men were arrested by the Colorado National Guard in relation to this incident, part of the early stages of the Colorado Coalfield War. Gambling, who managed to escape to a nearby dairy farm on Middle Creek, was attended to and aided back to the Oakview Mine the next day by the dairy farmer who routinely delivered milk to the mining camp.

Geography
La Veta is located at  (37.507681, -105.008038).

At one time (1919) there were sulfur springs in La Veta owned by Dr. Acker. They were last managed by W J Pierce of Colorado Springs.

Demographics

As of the 2020 United States Census, there were 862 people and 543 housing units in the town. The racial makeup of the town was 91.1% White, 0.9% American Indian, 0.4% Pacific Islander, 2.6% from other races, and 5.0% from two or more races. Hispanics and Latinos of any race were 11.4% of the population.

There were 415 households, of which 20.2% had children under the age of 18 living with them, 43.1% were married couples living together, 6.7% had a female householder with no husband present, 3.6% had a male householder with no wife present, and 46.5% were non-families. 42.7% of all households were made up of individuals, and 15.2% had someone living alone who was 65 years of age or older. The average household size was 1.93, and the average family size was 2.60.

The median age in the town was 52.8 years. 18.9% of residents were under the age of 18; 2.9% were between the ages of 18 and 24; 16.4% were from 25 to 44; 39.2% were from 45 to 64; and 22.6% were 65 years of age or older. The gender makeup of the town was 46.8% male and 53.2% female.

The median income for a household was $37,457, and the median income for a family was $66,964. Males had a median income of $50,577 versus $26,250 for females. The per capita income for the city was $26,066. About 12.0% of families and 10.9% of the population were below the poverty line, including 19.3% of those under age 18 and none of those age 65 or over.

Education
The town is served by La Veta School District Re-2, which brands itself as La Veta Public Schools.

Climate

Notable person
 Bob McGraw (1895-1978), baseball pitcher

See also

Outline of Colorado
Index of Colorado-related articles
State of Colorado
Colorado cities and towns
Colorado municipalities
Colorado counties
Huerfano County, Colorado

References

External links

CDOT map of the Town of La Veta
Photos of La Veta and Surroundings

Towns in Huerfano County, Colorado
Towns in Colorado